Ancylosis ochraceella is a species of snout moth in the genus Ancylosis. It was described by Jan Asselbergs in 2008 and is known from the United Arab Emirates.

References

Moths described in 2008
ochraceella
Moths of Asia